Hayley Elizabeth Ladd (born 6 October 1993) is a professional footballer who plays as a defender or midfielder for Women's Super League club Manchester United. Born in England, she has been capped internationally for Wales. 

She has previously played in England for Arsenal, Coventry City, Bristol Academy/City and Birmingham City as well as a short spell in Finland with Kokkola F10.

Club career

Early career
Formerly a youth at St Albans City, Ladd also trained with Arsenal's development academy having joined when she was 9 years old. In June 2012, Ladd joined Naisten Liiga club Kokkola Futis 10 on a four-month loan having struggled to break into the Arsenal team. The move was arranged by the Finnish coach of the Welsh national team, Jarmo Matikainen. It timed well with the break between the end of her A Level studies and the beginning of her degree course.

Coventry City
 
Upon her return to the UK, Ladd joined Coventry City in the FA Women's Premier League National Division in October 2012, initially on loan, making her debut in a 2–1 defeat at Manchester City. She spent three years with the Sky Blues while pursuing a Human Biology degree at nearby Loughborough University, ending in 2015.

Bristol City
In January 2015, Ladd signed with FA WSL team Bristol Academy, later rebranded as Bristol City, where she played for three seasons.

Birmingham City
Ladd signed for Birmingham City on 31 July 2017, where she played for a further two seasons until 29 May 2019, when Ladd announced her decision to leave Birmingham City, after turning down a new contract.

Manchester United
On 5 June 2019, Ladd agreed to sign with Manchester United ahead of the team's first season in the FA WSL. Ladd made her debut for Manchester United against Manchester City in the FA WSL on 7 September 2019, a 1–0 loss in the inaugural Manchester derby. She scored her first goal for the club on 21 November 2019 in an 11–1 League Cup Group Stage victory over Championship team Leicester City. At the end of her debut season with the club she was named Manchester United Women's Player of the Year.

On 24 February 2021, Ladd signed a contract extension with Manchester United until June 2023 with the option of a further year.

International career
  
Ladd was eligible to play for England through being born there, but chose to represent Wales. Ladd was named on standby for the senior Wales squad for the Algarve Cup in March 2011. On 15 June 2011, Ladd won her first cap as an 87th-minute substitute for Helen Lander in a 2–0 friendly defeat to New Zealand, played in Savièse, Switzerland. Five days later Ladd featured in Wales' 3–1 defeat to Colombia.

On 8 June 2017, Ladd scored her first international goal in a friendly win over Portugal. On 24 November 2017, she scored her first competitive international goal, a free kick in a 1–0 win over Kazakhstan during 2019 World Cup qualification. 

In January 2019, Ladd earned her 50th cap for Wales in a match against Italy. She was presented with a golden cap in recognition of the landmark in June 2019 by FAW Vice President Steve Williams and former men's international player Danny Gabbidon ahead of a match against New Zealand against whom she had made her senior debut 8 years prior.

Career statistics

Club 
.

International goals 
Wales score listed first, score column indicates score after each Ladd goal.

Honours
Individual
Manchester United Women's Player of the Year: 2019–20

References

External links

 Profile at the Manchester United F.C. website
 
 

1993 births
Living people
People from Dacorum (district)
Welsh women's footballers
Arsenal W.F.C. players
Coventry United W.F.C. players
Bristol Academy W.F.C. players
Women's Super League players
Wales women's international footballers
Expatriate women's footballers in Finland
Kansallinen Liiga players
Kokkola Futis 10 players
Birmingham City W.F.C. players
Women's association football defenders
Women's association football midfielders
Manchester United W.F.C. players